Al-Judaydah (also spelled Jadideh or Jdeideh)  is a Syrian village in the Mahardah Subdistrict of the Mahardah District in Hama Governorate. According to the Syria Central Bureau of Statistics (CBS), al-Judaydah had a population of 2,166 at the 2004 census.

References 

Populated places in Mahardah District